Masters of the Universe: The Arcade Game is a platform game developed by Adventure Soft for the Amstrad CPC, BBC Micro, Commodore 64, and ZX Spectrum and published by U.S. Gold in 1987. The game is part of the Masters of the Universe media franchise.  The Commodore 64 version is titled He-Man and the Masters of the Universe: The Ilearth Stone.

In the same year, U.S. Gold also published Masters of the Universe: The Super Adventure.

References

External links

1987 video games
Amstrad CPC games
BBC Micro and Acorn Electron games
Commodore 64 games
ZX Spectrum games
Masters of the Universe video games
Multiplayer and single-player video games
U.S. Gold games
Video games scored by Ben Daglish
Video games set on fictional planets
Video games developed in the United Kingdom
Adventure Soft games